Willy Kemp (28 December 1925 – 18 October 2021) was a Luxembourgish professional road bicycle racer.

Kemp came from a wealthy home and studied economics. After becoming an amateur 1947 World University Cycling Champion, his parents agreed that he should become a professional cyclist. In 1949 he became national champion. Between 1948 and 1957 he rode every year the Tour de France (10 times in total) and won a stage in the 1955 Tour de France.

He died on 18 October 2021, at the age of 95. Prior to his death, he was noted as Luxembourg's oldest living professional cyclist.

Major results

1947
  World University Cycling Champion, road race
  World University Cycling Championships, individual pursuit
  World University Cycling Championships, team pursuit
GP Faber
1949
 national road race championships
1950
 Stage 2 Tour de Luxembourg
1951
 2nd  national road race championships
1952
 Stage 1 Ronde van Nederland
 Stage 4a Tour de Luxembourg
 2nd Overall: Euskal Bizikleta
 1st Stage 1
1954
 Stage 3 Tour de Picardie
1955
 2nd  national road race championships
 3rd Overall, Tour de Picardie
 1st Stage 2
 Stage 4 Tour de France
1956
 Stage 3 Tour de Luxembourg
1957
 3rd  national road race championships

References

External links

Official Tour de France results for Willy Kemp

1925 births
2021 deaths
Luxembourgian male cyclists
Luxembourgian Tour de France stage winners
People from Kopstal